Slumber Tsogwane (born 21 September 1960) is the current Vice President of Botswana and also Member of Parliament for Boteti West. He is the longest serving Member of Parliament of the 12th Parliament of Botswana. He took office on 4 April 2018, succeeding Mokgweetsi Masisi. He is a member of the Botswana Democratic Party.

Early life and education 
Slumber Tsogwane holds a Bachelor's Degree in Humanities obtained in 1985 from the University of Botswana, and a Master's Degree in Development Studies from the same university.

Career 
Tsogwane joined politics from public services where he was in the teaching fraternity holding the position of Deputy School Head. In 1997, he unsuccessfully applied for the post of BDP Executive Secretary. In 1998, Tsogwane defeated incumbent, Gabofele Masusu in primaries for Boteti constituency, and won the subsequent general elections in 1999. Tsogwane was appointed to cabinet in 2002, by Festus Mogae becoming Assistant Minister of Finance and Development Planning under Baledzi Gaolathe. He was dropped from cabinet following the 2004 general elections, joining the backbench. In 2014, after retaining Boteti West constituency, he was appointed Minister of Local Government and Rural Development by Ian Khama. Tsogwane is a member of the Botswana Democratic Party and also a Member of Parliament for Boteti West Constituency.   He formerly served as Botswana's Local Government and Rural Development Minister from November 2014 to March 2018.  Tsogwane took office on 4 April 2018 as Vice President of Botswana succeeding Mokgweetsi Masisi.

He is an alumnus of the University of Botswana.

See also 

 Mokgweetsi Masisi
 Ian Khama

References

External links 

Living people
1960 births
Botswana Democratic Party politicians
Vice-presidents of Botswana
Members of the National Assembly (Botswana)
People from Central District (Botswana)
University of Botswana alumni